Núria Marín Martínez (born 26 December 1963) is a Socialists' Party of Catalonia politician. She has been a city councillor in Catalonia's second largest city, L'Hospitalet de Llobregat, since 1995 and its mayor since 2008, and also President of the Provincial Deputation of Barcelona since 2019. She has been the party's president since December 2019.

Biography
Marín became mayor Celestino Corbacho's first deputy in 2007. When he resigned the following year to become Minister of Work and Immigration, she was elected as his successor, with 18 votes out of 25. She became L'Hospitalet de Llobregat's third mayor since the Spanish transition to democracy, and the first woman in the office.

In 2011, she was elected to the Provincial Deputation of Barcelona, and resigned in December 2014 to concentrate on her role as mayor. In July 2019, she was invested as President of the Provincial Deputation, with the deputies from her party and Together for Catalonia voting in favour. That November, she was elected President of the Serra de Collserola Natural Park consortium.

In 2017, Marín was elected to one of three seats held by the Socialists' Party of Catalonia (PSC) in the executive of the Spanish Socialist Workers' Party (PSOE). Formerly vice secretary to PSC leader Miquel Iceta, she replaced Àngel Ros as party president in December 2019.

Marín was arrested and bailed in December 2020 for alleged diversion of funds. She maintains her innocence and is backed by her parties. Her trial began in April 2021.

References

1963 births
Living people
People from L'Hospitalet de Llobregat
Municipal councillors in the province of Barcelona
Provincial Deputation Presidents of Spain
Socialists' Party of Catalonia politicians
Mayors of places in Catalonia
Women mayors of places in Spain